William Archibald Borthwick  (20 November 1924 – 31 July 2001) was an Australian politician. Borthwick was a Liberal Party member of the Victorian Legislative Assembly for the electorates of Scoresby (1960–1967) and Monbulk (1967–1982).

Early life and military service
Borthwick was born in Murrayville in north-western Victoria, and attended state schools in Cowangie and Walpeup before gaining a scholarship to study at Ballarat Grammar School between 1936 and 1939. From 1940 to 1957, he was a bank officer for the State Bank of Victoria, then worked as an insurance representative.

In December 1942, Borthwick enlisted in the Royal Australian Air Force. He served as a fighter pilot in England, Italy and Yugoslavia, and received a special award from the Yugoslavian government for his efforts in protecting Yugoslavia during  World War II.

Political career
Borthwick was elected to the Victorian Legislative Assembly in a September 1960 by-election for the seat of Scoresby triggered by the death of the sitting MP, Sir George Knox. At the 1967 state election, Borthwick switched to the new seat of Monbulk.

Bill Borthwick made a significant contribution to Victoria's environmental policies through the establishment of the Land Conservation Council in 1971 (now Victorian Environmental Assessment Council) which insulated controversial public land management recommendations from political interference.

Honours
In the 1987 Queen's Birthday honours, Borthwick was made a Member of the Order of Australia (AM) in recognition of service to the Victorian parliament and to the community.

References

1924 births
2001 deaths
Members of the Victorian Legislative Assembly
Victorian Ministers for the Environment
Liberal Party of Australia members of the Parliament of Victoria
Members of the Order of Australia
Deputy Premiers of Victoria
Royal Australian Air Force officers
Royal Australian Air Force personnel of World War II
People from Murrayville, Victoria
20th-century Australian politicians
People educated at Ballarat Grammar School
Military personnel from Victoria (Australia)